Lindeman Islands National Park is a national park covering the Lindeman Islands in Queensland, Australia, 885 km northwest of Brisbane.

See also

 Protected areas of Queensland

References

National parks of Queensland
North Queensland